A solar-powered waste compactor is a smart device that reads a waste bin's fill-level in real-time and triggers an automatic compaction of the waste, effectively increasing the bin's capacity by up to 5-8 times. The compaction mechanism runs on a battery, which is charged by the solar panel. Fully charged, the battery reserve lasts for approximately 3–4 weeks depending on the compaction frequency and usage patterns.

Solar-powered waste compactors are typically connected to a remote software platform through wireless 2G/3G networks. The platform enables waste collection managers to access real-time data analytics and route optimization.

Solar-powered compactors are primarily used in high foot traffic areas such as town centers, shopping malls, amusement parks, beaches, transit stations and sports stadiums.

Advantages 
Some of the benefits of using solar-powered waste compactors include:
 Reduced frequency of waste collections
 Cleaner and more hygienic public spaces
 Historical waste collection data analytics
 Reduction in greenhouse gas emissions
 Savings in operational waste collection costs

See also 
 BigBelly
 Ecube Labs

References

External links 
 Anta Swiss AG
 BigBelly Solar
 PEL Waste Reduction Equipment
 Mr. Fill
 Ecube Labs
 BritishBins SolaPacta
 Binology LLC

Waste management
Smart devices